Chinatown is an unincorporated community in the town of Osceola, Fond du Lac County, Wisconsin, United States. Chinatown is located on the northeast shore of Long Lake near the Sheboygan County line.

According to tradition, the community was named for the Oriental-appearance of early lakeside houses built on stilts.

Notes

Unincorporated communities in Fond du Lac County, Wisconsin
Unincorporated communities in Wisconsin